Camille Galliard-Minier (née Galliard; born 26 May 1975) is a French politician and lawyer, the deputy for Isère's 1st constituency in the National Assembly of France from 2020 to 2022.

Biography
Camille Galliard-Minier grew up in a family committed to local politics: her mother was elected in the town of La Tronche, and her grandfather, Louis Gaillard, was mayor of this same municipality from 1971 to 1985.

In 2003, Camille Galliard-Minier defended a doctoral thesis in law under the supervision of Pierre Murat.

Political Career
Defining herself a member of the centre-left, she is a member of La République En Marche!
In the 2017 legislative elections, she was the substitute for Olivier Véran in Isère's 1st constituency. She became the deputy in March 2020, following Véran's appointment to the government.

References

External links
 Her page on the site of the National Assembly
 Her professional page

21st-century French women politicians
Deputies of the 15th National Assembly of the French Fifth Republic
La République En Marche! politicians
Living people
1975 births